Pankshin is a Local Government Area in Plateau State, Nigeria. Its headquarter is in the town of Pankshin.

It has an area of 1,524 km and a population of 191,685 at the 2006 census.

Pankshin is popularly known for its trade hub as most of the people are farmers growing a vast range of food crops such as millet, guinea corn, maize, tomatoes, rice, onions, cabbage, carrot and collections of fruits. Mondays in Pankshin is specifically for trading – buying and selling, hence the name "Monday market" as traders, merchants and people in the environs and as far as away as Bauchi come to buy and sell.

The postal code of the area is 933.

Language and tribes
Situated amidst people with diverse cultures, Pankshin inhabitants speak a number of languages including Ngas, Mupun, Miship, Fier, Tal, Kadung, Pal and Bijim. They are lovable people with high regard for people irrespective of colour, gender or tribe. Predominantly populated by Ngas. Other tribes are the Mupun, Miship, Fier, Tal, Kadung, Pal, and Bijim. The Hausas, Igbos, Yorubas and the Idomas are scarcely represented.

Religion
Pankshin inhabitants are mostly Christians with few Traditional Religionists, and few Muslims respectively. 
The predominantly populated church is the Church of Christ in Nations. Other churches include the Roman Catholic Church, Evangelical Church Winning All, Anglican church, Deeper Life Bible Church, Foursquare Gospel Church, Assemblies of God, The Redeemed Christian church of God, Living faith, Christ Apostolic Church, Christ Embassy etc.

Financial institutions
There are four banks currently in Pankshin: UBA opposite NCCF family house, Unity bank, Bank of Agriculture and Union bank of Nigeria.
With the increase in number of students in the institutions, Pankshin will need more banks.

Temperature
Pankshin is well known for its relatively cool temperatures.
The range of temperatures could be hottest between April to early June, while heavy rainfalls are between late June to mid-August. The coldest temperature can be felt in mid-November to late February, January being the coldest month.

Educational institutions
Pankshin accommodates two great institutions:
Federal university of Education, Pankshin.
College of Health Technology, Pankshin.

Environment
The serene atmosphere relishes a mild and topmost excitement in the air as you could see hills of varying heights, exquisite relaxation centres, dams, springs, rich plateaux, hotels, etc.

References

Local Government Areas in Plateau State